Yoo Ki-hong (born March 24, 1988) is a South Korean former professional cyclist.

Major results
2009
 1st Stage 9 Tour de Korea
2010
 1st Overall Daetongryeonggi Gapyeong Stage Race
1st Stage 1
 1st Stage 2 Tour de Korea
2011
 1st Stage 7 Tour de Korea

References

External links

1988 births
Living people
South Korean male cyclists